Francisco Flores  may refer to:

 Francisco Flores (1926–1986) (1926–1986), Mexican football midfielder
 Francisco Flores Pérez (1959–2016), president of El Salvador
 Francisco Flores (wrestling) (fl. 1960–1970s), Mexican wrestling promoter
 Francisco Flores (footballer, born 1988), Nicaraguan football left-back
 Francisco Flores (Venezuelan footballer) (born 1990), Venezuelan football defensive-midfielder
 Francisco Flores (footballer, born 1994), Mexican football right-back
 Francisco Flores (athlete), Honduran track and field athlete in 1993 World Championships in Athletics – Men's 400 metres
 Francisco Flores (Argentine footballer) (born 2002), Argentine football centre-back